The 1937 World Table Tennis Championships – Corbillon Cup (women's team) was the fourth edition of the women's team championship. 

United States won the gold medal with a perfect 8–0 round robin match record. Germany won the silver medal and Czechoslovakia took the bronze medal.

Final table

See also
List of World Table Tennis Championships medalists

References

-
1937 in women's table tennis